Reign (AM-288) was an Admirable-class minesweeper built for the U.S. Navy during World War II. She was built at the General Engineering & Dry Dock Company, of Alameda, California and completed in 1946, but she was never commissioned. Reign remained in the Pacific Reserve Fleet until struck from the Navy list 1 November 1959. During that time, however, she was redesignated MSF-288 on 7 February 1955.

References

External links 

Admirable-class minesweepers
Ships built in Alameda, California
1944 ships
World War II minesweepers of the United States